Massacre Play  (also known as The Wounded King) is a 1989 Italian thriller-drama film directed by Damiano Damiani.

Plot

Cast 
 Tomas Milian as Clem Da Silva 
 Elliott Gould as  Theo Steiner 
 Nathalie Baye as  Bella 
 John Steiner as  Danilo 
 Eva Robin's as  Rosita 
 Galeazzo Benti as  Cornelius Plank 
 Michael Gothard as  Zabo 
 Peter Woodthorpe as  Straccalino

See also
List of Italian films of 1989

References

External links

1989 films
Films directed by Damiano Damiani
Italian thriller drama films
1989 thriller films
Films scored by Riz Ortolani
1980s Italian-language films
1980s thriller drama films
1980s Italian films